Mark Duncan or Marc Duncan may refer to:

Renaissance
 Mark Duncan (regent) (1570?–1640), Scottish regent of the University of Saumur
 Mark Duncan de Cérisantis (died 1648), son of the preceding, French and Swiss diplomat, and secretary to Henry II, Duke of Guise

Music
 Mark Duncan, English bass guitarist with The Dogs D'Amour in the 1980s 
 Marc Duncan, American bass guitarist with Prayer for Cleansing in the 1990s 
 Marc Duncan, English member of The Rockingbirds

Television
 Mark Duncan, creator of several Bill & Ben Video Doctor Who episodes
 Mark Duncan, played Mark Tanner in Swift and Shift Couriers, Australian comedy series

Sport
Mark Duncan (coach), American football player and coach, and basketball coach
 Mark Duncan, played basketball for Scotland at the 2006 Commonwealth Games
 Mark Duncan, interim  Denver Pioneers men's basketball head coach in 1943
 Mark Duncan, Kiama Knights rugby league player; 2004 Group 7 Player of the Year
 Mark Duncan, wide receiver on the 2009 Delaware Fightin' Blue Hens football team
 Marc Duncan, Dutch MMA fighter, lost a 2006 It's Showtime 70MAX MMA Championship title fight